Rodgersia podophylla is a species of flowering plant in the saxifrage family native to Japan and Korea. It is extensively grown for ornamental use in gardens where it prefers damp shady positions on neutral to acid soils. Though hardy to  it enjoys a sheltered location. It is chosen primarily for its clumps of large 5- or 7-toothed palmate leaves, which open bronze, turning green in summer and bronze-red in autumn. It can spread by underground rhizomes, eventually covering a large area.

The compact cultivar ‘Rotlaub’ has gained the Royal Horticultural Society’s Award of Garden Merit.

References

 

Saxifragaceae
Flora of Japan
Flora of Korea